Samaya Hathare Dori is a 2007 Indian Oriya film directed by Amulya Das.

Cast
Siddhanta Mahapatra 
Anu Chowdhury 
Mihir Das
Aparajita Mohanty 
Meghna Mishra
Debajani
Debu Bose  
Dorian Cenaj

References

External links
 

2007 films
2000s Odia-language films